Galford can refer to:

 Ellen Galford, American-born Scottish writer
 Galford near Lew Trenchard in Devon, England; the likely site of Gafulford where a battle took place in 825 AD
 Galford D. Weller, a character from the Samurai Shodown game series
 Robert M. Galford, American author